Dajal is a Tehsil in the south-west of Punjab, Pakistan. It is located in Jampur District , . It has a population of around 200,000, and the main languages spoken are Saraiki and Balochi.

Etymology

Daajal town was established by a saint named Dawood, when he was passing through a mud dunes, he stayed there under the tree, in local Siraiki language it is called "JAAL". After that place become a small village and called as Doowd Jaal, Afterward when population was increasing, town name changed to Dawojal and finally Daajal.

History

During the rule of Langahs in 1452, Islam Khan a relation of Lodhi King of Delhi was in charge of the southern part of the Multan Province. Nahars overthrew the supremacy of Langah and the then Lodhi King of Delhi approved the act. Nahars annexed a greater part of Dera Ghazi Khan and charged upon the territory of Daajal and Harrand in the north. Their march was repelled by Miranis in 1482. Albeit the country around Harrand and Daajal inhabited by Gorchani and Lunds tribes was governed by Khan of Kalat Mir Noori Naseer Khan Baloch for 70 years after defeating Ahmed Shah Abdali in 1758. Khan of Kalat retained this tract of land until 1827. Besides the area around Daajal and Harrand the Baloch tribes of Koh-e-Suleman including Marris, Bugtis and Kethrans are said to have been under nominal subjugation of Khan of Kalat though Qaisranis and Buzdars served as personal body guards of Khan of Kalat , but the Khan could never extend his direct sway over these tribes i.e. Qaisranis, Buzdars, Lunds, Babbars, Khosas, Legharis, Gorchanis and Mazaris inhabiting the mountainous tract from north of south
The country of Harrand and Daajal came under the control of Khan of Kalat Mir Naseer Khan Baloch after defeating Ahmed Shah Abdali in Kalat Balochistan in 1758. This tract remained under the Khanate up till 1827. In 1827, the Nawab of Bhawalpur occupied the country of Daajal and Harrand for Sikh and thus the rule of Khan of Kalat came to an end over this area. Kabul, the British Government in 1838, at Lahore, ratified the treaty of 1834 between the Shah and the Maharajah.

By this treaty Shah Shuja renounced his claim to all jurisdiction over the province of Harrand Daajal, at that time still nominally in the Kalat Khanate. Soon after Ranjit Singh's death in 1839. no one having been- found fit to fill the place of that astute ruler, the whole of this part of the country fell into a state of anarchy. The Kalat Sardars, instigated, it is said, by the Khan, raided Harrand Daajal in retaliation for the conduct of the Sikh Government, and in their endeavour to recover the stolen province, all became anarchy and confusion throughout the Dera Ghazi Khan district. The conquest of Sindh in 1843 and annexation of the Punjab in 1849 advanced our North- West Frontier across the Indus to the hills bordering Afghanistan and Kalat. In this connection one feature is distinctly noticeable. Prior to, the Tripartite Treaty of 1838 the district of Harrand Daajal – including the Gurchanis, Mazaris, and certain Harris – was claimed by the Khan of Kalat.

Administrative status 
On the end of 2022 PTI Punjab Govt give the status of Tehsil Dajal in the newest District Jampur In Dera Ghazi Khan Division.

Irrigation system

Daajal Canal
The Daajal Canal is the main source of irrigation for the people of the area and for population of whole Rajanpur District. It is drained from the Taunsa Barrage of the Indus River. It is an artificial watercourse in the country of Pakistan. Its center lies at a latitude of 29.5418000 and longitude of 70.3600000 and it has an elevation of 124 meters above sea level.

Rod Kohi 
Major Rod Kohi areas traversed by hill torrents constitute nearly 65 percent of the total area of Pakistan and encompass entire Balochistan. Rod-Kohi or hill torrent cultivation is a unique system of agriculture being practiced in all the four provinces.people Living in Pachadh area store rod kohi water for the cultivation of crop. Every year in summer season rod kohi water effected the vast area of Daajal and pachad. Mostly people and animals lost their life. Govt. of Pakistan made small dam but due to the huge water all small dam were destroyed.

Agriculture
The land of Daajal is very fertile in regard to agriculture. Cotton, wheat are generally produced in Daajal.   Different vegetables are also grown there. Mangoes and dates are common fruits grown in this region.

Harand Fort

Raja Harnacus" and his son Lok Bhagat had constructed the Fort of Harrand on the style of Monojodero. That is the reason structure of Harrand Fort seems contemporaneous civilization of Monojodero. Muslim rulers from Muhammad Bin Qasim to Ahmed Shah Abdali had maintained their sovereignty at this area. When the Region of Harrand was being ruled by Nadir. This fort was a route passage for Afghan-Iranian Invaders to Multan and India. It is said that Alexander the Great passed through this area on his quest to conquer the world. Antiques found in this area point to Alexander's visit. According to local legend Alexander was inspired by the beauty of a local queen named Rukhsana and married her in Harand Fort. Locals say that the Unilever soap Rexona was named after her.

Notable things

Daajal (cattle)
The Dajal are a draft type of cattle and are found mainly in the Daajal area in district Rajan Pur in Punjab Province. Their color is white or gray, deepening to almost black on the neck, shoulder and hump in mature males. The average weight at maturity of Daajal cattle is 500 kg for males and 390 kg for females.
The Daaal breed is an offshoot of Bhagnari breed, having almost similar points. However, Daajal cattle are comparatively smaller in size and lighter in color.

Daajal Cattle Breeding Farm
Daajal Cattle Breeding Farm was established in 1985 on the state landing Rakh DhundhiFazilpur.
The farm land was transferred to WPADC in February 1964 to operate it as seed farm.
After a lapse of 8 years i.e. 1972, the WPADC was dissolved and the Punjab government again decided to establish a cattle breeding farm at Fazilpur to cope with the demands of Dera Ghazi Khan Division.
Initially a livestock experiment station was established in 1972–73 for the breeding of Daajal cattle and Awassi sheep, but soon after the Daajal breed of cattle was replaced with Sahiwal under the direction of the provincial cabinet. Accordingly, the scheme was revised and implemented with effect from 1973–74 to breed pure Sahiwal for the objectives given in the next paragraphs.
Buffalos found in Pakistan make up 47% of Pakistan's major dairy animal's population providing more than about 61% of the total milk produced in the country. Buffalo breeds found in Pakistan are Nili Ravi, Kundi and Aza Kheli. Nili Ravi is considered best buffalo breed in world and known as Black Gold of Pakistan. Cattle constitute about 53% of the national population of major dairy animals in Pakistan and contribute the share of almost 34.9% to the total milk production in country. The cattle breeds found in the country are Sahiwal, Cholistani, Red Sndhi, Achai, Bhagnari, Daajal, Dhanni, Gibrali, Kankraj, Lohani, Rojhan, and Thari. Out of these, Sahiwal, Cholistani, and Red Sindhi are main dairy breeds and well known internationally due to their distinct characteristics. Other than well-defined cattle breeds, there are a large number of nondescript cattle breeds and crossbred cattle.
Sahiwal and Cholistani are the two main dairy breeds of cattle. Their average milk production per lactation is about 1200–1800 liters with 4.5% butter fat. The age at first calving is more than 3.5 years and calving interval ranges between 1.5 and 2 years. Dhanni, Daajal and Rojhan are draught type breeds with milk production potential of 800–1000 liters per lactation. Utility of these draught breeds has declined over the years due to increased mechanization in agriculture. The production recording and progeny testing program is being executed in Sahiwal breed only and is limited to institutional herds.
 Khir paray: A product made from milk.
 Mud Pots Gharay (water store pot) and Danwray are very famous.

Four Sufi Sultans
Daajal is also the place of four Sufi sultans and saints named Abharng Sultan, Sanghi Sultan and Ganwar Sultan. Bodla Bahar and Ameer Hamza Sultan is the most famous of all these. The Abharang Sultan Gathering (Maela) is a local festival. This festival (maela) starts from 1st Safar ul Muzzaffar to eight Safar ul Muzzaffar.
People from nearby places come to see this maela. Chiragh are also lighted on the Tomb of Ahmad Abhrang Sultan.

Marri 
Marri is a hilly station in the Suliman Range, situated only few kilometres from Daajal
(near the Lalgarh union council).
Marri (Urdu: مرى) is a hill station in Rajanpur District, south Punjab, Pakistan.
Its altitude is approximately 4800 ft above from sea level.
It is about 75 km (47 mi) away from Fazilpur, 116 km (72 mi) from Jampur, 100 km (62 mi) away from Rajanpur and 116 km (72 mi) from Mithankot.
Beautiful site and newly built Road is also seeable. Visitors can reach Marri from Fazilpur,
Hajipur, Lalgarh and Daajal Road. It is also called Tumman-Gorchani. Because Gorchani tribe are living there.
Chief of Gorchani tribe is Sardar Shehk Haidar Gorchani.
Marri is a Bloch word which means "Ghar" Home.
People from Daajal and nearby area go to Marri in summer season.

Roads and facilities 
 Jampur Road and Muhammadpur Road: Daajal is connected with rest of the Punjab with Jampur Road and Muhammadpur Road. Jampur Road is the main route of communication.
 Harand Road: Harand Road connects Harand, the last union council of the Punjab, with Daajal. There is a gate called Darra which acts as a border between the Rajanpur district and tribal area of Balochistan.
 Dhandla Road: Dhandla Road connected the Northern Area of The city Basti Dhandla , Tal Shumali And many other villages Also Darkhast Jamal khan
 'Jogiyani Road' : Jogiyani Road connects Basti Jogiyani and attached to Dhandhla Road and bypass road Daajal.
 Markets : Daajal has got three main commercial areas. The first one is Sadar Baazar Daajal, which serves as the main market. The second is market, at which primarily cloths and shoes are sold. The third commercial area is Harand Road. The Machian chowk is the main square of Daajal where can go on until 12 am.
 Schools: Daajal has five public primary schools, and a secondary school, for boys and girls each, and there are numerous private schools operating within the town and one a girls university.
 Banks: Two banks including the National Bank and the Muslim Commercial Bank of Pakistan operate branches in Daajal.
 Hospitals: Daajal has 10 bedded Rural Health Centres (RHC). However most of the medical facilities are provided by the private general practitioners clinics.
 Parks: Daajal has two parks one Children Park and other Majeed Jiskani Park but this time are under construction.
 Post office, police station and communications: Daajal has a post office, a police stations and a digital telephone exchange. PTCL broadband and Vfone internet facility are available in Daajal. Cable television is also available.
 Mobile network: All of Pakistan's main five cellular companies, Ufone, Mobilink, Zong, Warid Pakistan and Telenor, have their towers in Daajal.
 Water supply: Due to bitter soil water, a water supply scheme was started to drain drinkable water from Jampur to Daajal.

Nearby places 
 Basti Shah Bakhsh jogiyani 3.1 km pari wala basti dal 2 km
 Tufki1. 9 km / 1.2 miles Hothi4.8 km / 3 miles Mayo1. 9 km / 1.2 miles Binda Burra 4.8 km / 3 miles Basti Miyo 1.9 km / 1.2 miles Onar 2.5 km / 1.5 miles Hoti 4.8 km
5.2 km / 3.2 miles
 Raqba Dhandlah 3.2 km / 2 miles Basti Hanbhi 5.2 km / 3.2 miles Raqba Dhandla 3.2 km / Raqba Dhandlah 3.2 km / 2 miles Basti Buchrah6.4 km / 4 miles 3.7 km / 2.3 miles
 Kotha jindo Khan / 3.5 miles
 bitah Ghulam Ali Khan /6.7 miles
 Buchara6.4 km / 4 miles
 Danwar3.7 km / 2.3 miles
 Patwali7.4 km / 4.6 miles
 Basti Qasab 3.7 km / 2.3 miles
 Basti Dhandlah 9.3 km / 5.8 miles
Basti thamber 5.4 km north from daajal
 Isran 4 km / 2.5 miles
 Basti Dulle 4.3 km / 2.6 miles
Basti Mahal Mahtam /7.2 km
 Punjab (Pakistan)
 Pakistan
 Dera Ghazi Khan
 Kotla Mughlan
 Jampur

References

External links
 https://web.archive.org/web/20120326132227/http://www.nrb.gov.pk/lg_election/union.asp?district=27&dn=Rajanpur
 http://pakistaniat.com/2010/01/23/traveling-on-n55-the-indus-highway-part-ii/
 http://www.ansi.okstate.edu/breeds/cattle/
 http://wikimapia.org/9846425/Daajal

Populated places in Rajanpur District